Delano Ladan (born 9 February 2000) is a Dutch professional footballer who plays as winger for Eerste Divisie club TOP Oss.

Career
On 24 June 2022, Ladan joined Eerste Divisie club TOP Oss; his second stint with the club after a successful loan in the 2018–19 season.

References

External links
 

2000 births
Living people
Dutch footballers
Netherlands youth international footballers
ADO Den Haag players
TOP Oss players
SC Cambuur players
Eredivisie players
Eerste Divisie players
Association football forwards
People from Leiderdorp
Footballers from South Holland